The Liberal Democratic Party is a liberal party in Angola, and is a member of Liberal International. In the 1992 elections, the PLD won 2.4% of the vote, gaining three seats in parliament. However, in the 2008 legislative election, the party gained only 0.33% of the vote and no seats in Parliament. The party's founder and leader is Anália de Victória Pereira.

See also
Liberalism
Contributions to liberal theory
Liberalism worldwide
List of liberal parties
Liberal democracy

External links
Liberal Democratic Party official website (down)

Liberal parties in Angola
Political parties in Angola
Political parties established in 1983
1983 establishments in Angola